Helena Rut Örvarsdóttir (born 17 May 1994) is an Icelandic handballer who plays for Stjarnan and the Iceland national team.

Achievements
Úrvalsdeild kvenna: 
Silver Medalist: 2017

References

1994 births
Living people
Helena Orvarsdottir
Helena Orvarsdottir
Expatriate handball players
Helena Orvarsdottir
Helena Orvarsdottir
21st-century Icelandic women